Edward Keith Davies (born 19 February 1934) is an English footballer, who played as an inside forward in the Football League for Tranmere Rovers.

References

External links

Tranmere Rovers F.C. players
Association football inside forwards
English Football League players
1934 births
Living people
English footballers